The Shymkent Zoo (Shymkent haıýanhanasy) is the state zoo of the city Shymkent in Kazakhstan. It is one of the largest and oldest zoological parks in the country.

See also
List of zoos
Almaty Zoo
Karaganda Zoo

References

Zoos in Kazakhstan
Shymkent
Tourist attractions in Shymkent
Parks in Shymkent
Zoos established in 1980